Dessert Games is an American-based cooking television game show hosted by Duff Goldman and Guy Fieri on Food Network (USA), that debuted in 2017. The show is a spin-off to Guy's Grocery Games (GGG).

Synopsis
Each episode features four chefs competing in a three-round elimination contest, cooking desserts with ingredients found in a supermarket grocery store (GGG's Flavortown Market) as Duff or Guy poses unusual challenges to them. The winning chef can collect $10,000.

History
The show is based on the popular show Guy’s Grocery Games, which aired back in October 2013 and has had a run of 15 seasons.

The host of this new show Dessert Games is Guy Fieri together with the judges Ron Ben Israel and Duff Goldman. The show is produced by the production company Lando Entertainment and the executive producer is by John Bravakis, Steve Kroopnick, Brian Lando, Francesco Giuseppe Pace and Guy Fieri.

A backdoor pilot for the series aired as part of GGG, season 9 episode 12, "Guy's Dessert Grocery Games", aired on 26 June 2016 under the title Guy's Dessert Games, featuring Duff suggesting the theme of the show to Guy, and being a judge on that 2016 episode.

The series first airs in 2017 on the Food Network, with Duff as host, and Guy as guest star, with the standard complement of 3 judges and 4 competitors in an episode, inheriting from GGG.

Games

The games played on the game show include:

Seasons

Episodes

Season 1

See also
 Guy's Grocery Games

References

External links
 Food Network USA: Dessert Games
 Food Network Canada: Dessert Games

Food Network original programming
2017 American television series debuts
2010s American cooking television series